The 2013–14 Liiga season is the 39th season of the Liiga (formerly SM-liiga), the top level of ice hockey in Finland, since the league's formation in 1975. The title was won by Kärpät who defeated Tappara in the finals.

This was the first season in which the league was officially known as "Liiga", having dropped the "SM" prefix. It was also the last season in the Liiga for Jokerit, which joined the Russia-based Kontinental Hockey League after the season.

Teams

Regular season
Top six advanced straight to quarter-finals, while teams between 7th and 10th positions played wild card round for the final two spots. The Liiga is a closed series and thus there is no relegation.

Playoffs

Bracket

Wild card round (best-of-three)

(7) Jokerit vs. (10) HPK

HPK wins the series 2-0.

(8) Pelicans vs. (9) HIFK

Pelicans wins the series 2-0

Quarterfinals (best-of-seven)

(1) Kärpät vs. (10) HPK

Kärpät wins the series 4-0

(2) Tappara vs. (8) Pelicans

Tappara wins the series 4-2

(3) Lukko vs (6) Blues

Lukko wins the series 4–3.

(4) SaiPa vs. (5) JYP

SaiPa wins the series 4–3.

Semifinals (best-of-seven)

(1) Kärpät vs. (4) SaiPa

Kärpät wins the series 4–1.

(2) Tappara vs. (3) Lukko

Tappara wins the series 4–3.

Bronze medal game

Finals (best-of-seven) 

Kärpät wins the finals 4–3.

Final rankings

External links
Official site of the Liiga

Liiga seasons
1
Finnish